Ilija Despot (Zaostrog, 20 July 1885 – Split, 28 November 1970) was a Croatian theologian, lawyer, poet and writer.

Early life 
Ilija Despot was the son of Pavao Despot (1847 - 1888) and countess Manda Kostanjić (1849 - 1918) of the noble House of Kostanjić from Drvenik. He was also the nephew of the Croatian writer fra Ivan Despot after whose example he wished to become a priest. After his theological studies in Zadar he decided to remain a layman and went on to study law of which he achieved a doctoral title in Zagreb in 1920. He worked as a judge and lawyer and as a cultural associate in Križevci, Šibenik, Split etc. His writings are influenced mostly by Silvije Strahimir Kranjčević and Andrija Kačić Miošić who was a priest in the same franciscan monastery of Zaostrog as fra Ivan Despot. His numerous writings include poems, travelogues and cultural, historical and biographical studies.

He was married to Iva Paulina Mardešić (born 1899) of the wealthy industrial Mardešić family from the island Vis. Their son Pavao Despot (1936 - 2017) was also a notable writer and poet.

Bibliography 

 Drhtaji duše (1912)
 Duša (1914)
 Iseljenoj Hrvatskoj (1914)
 Nad grobom majke (1917)
 Kidanje (1926)

References

20th-century Croatian poets
Croatian male poets
1885 births
1970 deaths
20th-century male writers